Zeigler House may refer to several places in the United States:
 Jesse R. Zeigler House, in Frankfort, Kentucky
 John Zeigler Farm House, in Latimore Township, Adams County, Pennsylvania
 Lantz-Zeigler House, in Hagerstown, Maryland

See also 
 Ziegler House (disambiguation)
 Zeigler (disambiguation)